After Happily Ever After is an American reality competition series that premiered on October 19, 2022 on BET. The series is hosted by Bow Wow.

Episodes

References

External links

2020s American reality television series
2022 American television series debuts
BET original programming
English-language television shows
Reality competition television series
Television series by Bunim/Murray Productions